Nosratabad Rural District is a rural district (dehestan) in the Central District of Alborz County, Qazvin Province, Iran. At the 2006 census, its population was 16,093, in 4,077 families.  The rural district has 5 villages.

References 

Rural Districts of Qazvin Province
Alborz County